PP-275 Muzaffargarh-IV is a Constituency of  Provincial Assembly of Punjab.

General elections 2013

General elections 2008

See also
 PP-274 Muzaffargarh-III
 PP-276 Muzaffargarh-V

References

External links
 Election commission Pakistan's official website
 Awazoday.com check result
 Official Website of Government of Punjab

Provincial constituencies of Punjab, Pakistan
PP-259

Constituencies of Muzaffargarh
Politics of Muzaffargarh
Constituencies of Pakistan